The following events occurred in July 1926:

Thursday, July 1, 1926

The two-day-old government of Canadian Prime Minister Arthur Meighen was defeated in Parliament by one vote on a motion challenging the legality of Meighen's attempt to circumvent normal Parliamentary procedure by assembling a Cabinet consisting exclusively of acting ministers without portfolio. Though it was not strictly a motion of no confidence, Meighen accepted the vote as such.
The Swedish Air Force was founded.
Born: Robert Fogel, economist and Nobel Prize laureate, in New York City (d. 2013); Carl Hahn, auto executive, in Chemnitz, Germany (d. 2023); and Hans Werner Henze, composer, in Gütersloh, Germany (d. 2012)

Friday, July 2, 1926

President Plutarco Elías Calles of Mexico published the Calles Law, effective July 31, which banned religious education, foreign priests and political commentary in religious publications. Additionally, all church property was to become government property and worship could only be conducted inside of churches and under the supervision of local officials.
Canadian Governor General Julian Byng acted on Prime Minister Meighen's advice to dissolve the 15th Canadian Parliament and call a new federal election.
At the Wimbledon Men's Singles Final of tennis, Jean Borotra of France defeated Howard Kinsey of the United States.
Died: Émile Coué, 79, French psychologist

Saturday, July 3, 1926
At the Wimbledon Women's Singles Final of tennis, Kitty McKane Godfree of Britain defeated Lili de Alvarez.

Sunday, July 4, 1926
The Nazi Party staged its 2nd Party Congress in Weimar. The Grossdeutsche Jugendbewegung (Greater German Youth Movement) was rebranded Hitler Jugend Bund der deutschen Arbeiterjugend (Hitler Youth League of German Worker Youth), commonly referred to as the Hitler Youth.
The Sesquicentennial of the United States was celebrated to commemorate the 150th anniversary of the signing of the Declaration of Independence and the founding of the U.S. On this day, Poland chose to honour this sesquicentennial by collecting signatures for the Polish Declarations of Admiration and Friendship for the United States. This collection of 111 volumes of signatures and greetings was eight months later to President Calvin Coolidge to acknowledge American participation and aid to Poland during World War I. It comprised submissions from nearly one-sixth of the population of Poland as it then existed, including those of approximately 5.5 million school children.
Knoebels Amusement Resort opened in Pennsylvania.
Born: Alfredo Di Stéfano, footballer, in Buenos Aires, Argentina (d. 2014); Amos Elon, journalist and author, in Vienna, Austria (d. 2009); and Mary Stuart, actress and singer, in Miami, Florida (d. 2002)

Monday, July 5, 1926
Pope Pius XI designated August 1, the feast day of St. Peter ad Vincula, as a day of special prayers for the "deliverance of Mexican Catholics from persecution and for pardon for their persecutors."

Tuesday, July 6, 1926

French Finance Minister Joseph Caillaux spoke before the Chamber of Deputies, outlining the severity of the country's economic problems and asking for emergency powers to address them.

Wednesday, July 7, 1926
Joseph Caillaux's request of the previous day for special powers was widely attacked in the Chamber of Deputies. Léon Blum proclaimed, "Such action would be a veritable abdication of Parliament and violate the national sovereignty."
Edward Pearson Warner became the first Assistant Secretary of the Navy for Aeronautics.

Thursday, July 8, 1926
In Britain, fist fighting broke out in the House of Lords as it passed the Eight Hours Act, which permitted an extra hour of work per day in coal mines. Before Britain's miners were locked out they usually worked seven hours.
A grand jury convened in the Aimee Semple McPherson kidnapping case to question McPherson about some questionable details that had arisen in her account of what had happened to her.
Born: Elisabeth Kübler-Ross, psychiatrist, in Zürich, Switzerland (d. 2004)

Friday, July 9, 1926

The Northern Expedition officially commenced when Chiang Kai-shek lectured 100,000 soldiers of the National Revolutionary Army.
The Rudolph Valentino film The Son of the Sheik premiered in Los Angeles, but it wouldn't go into general release until September.
A solar eclipse transpired.
Born: Ben Roy Mottelson, Danish-American nuclear physicist and Nobel Prize laureate, in Chicago

Saturday, July 10, 1926
In a 4 a.m. vote following an all-night session, France's Chamber of Deputies voted to approve granting Finance Minister Joseph Caillaux the extraordinary powers he sought to address the country's economic crisis. The matter was then to go to the Finance Committee.
Bobby Jones won the U.S. Open, becoming the first golfer to win the British and U.S. Open in the same year.
A bolt of lightning struck Picatinny Arsenal in New Jersey. The resulting fire caused several million pounds of explosives to blow up in the next two to three days.
Macedonians from Bulgaria conducted the first of a series of raids across the border of the Kingdom of the Serbs, Croats and Slovenes. 
Born: Fred Gwynne, actor and author, in New York City (d. 1993)

Sunday, July 11, 1926
20,000 French veterans of World War I paraded silently through the rainy streets of Paris to protest the Mellon-Berenger Agreement. Blind and maimed veterans led the procession to the Place des États-Unis where they laid wreaths, as well as plaques explaining their position that the debt settlement would ruin France.
The Kuomintang captured Changsha.

Monday, July 12, 1926
General Motors acquired the Flint Institute of Technology in Michigan and renamed it the General Motors Institute of Technology. Today it is known as Kettering University. 
Died: Gertrude Bell, 57, English archaeologist, writer, spy, and administrator known as the "Uncrowned Queen of Iraq"; and  John W. Weeks, 66, American politician in the Republican Party

Tuesday, July 13, 1926
In Florence, King Victor Emmanuel III of Italy took a boy who had just been hit by a train into his auto and rushed the boy to the hospital. The boy died in the car.

Wednesday, July 14, 1926

Ziya Hurşit and thirteen others were publicly hanged in Turkey for conspiring to assassinate President Mustafa Kemal Atatürk.
In New York, Linton Wells and Edward Steptoe Evans completed their flight around the world in 28 days, 14 hours and 37 minutes, beating the old record of 35 days set by John Henry Mears in 1913.
Born: Harry Dean Stanton, actor and musician, in West Irvine, Kentucky (d. 2017)

Thursday, July 15, 1926

The Belgian government granted King King Albert of Belgium six months of practically unlimited powers to try to stop the country's worsening inflation problem.
BEST buses first ran in Mumbai, India.
Born: Leopoldo Galtieri, President of Argentina, in Caseros, Buenos Aires (d. 2003)

Friday, July 16, 1926
The Finance Committee of the Chamber of Deputies voted 14–13 against granting Finance Minister Joseph Caillaux the power to legislate by decree to address the currency devaluation crisis, which worsened as the bourse closed with the franc trading at 206.40 to the British pound and 42.49 to the U.S. dollar.
Jack Delaney defeated Paul Berlenbach to win boxing's World Light Heavyweight Title.
Born: Stanley Clements, actor and comedian, in Long Island, New York (d. 1981); and Irwin Rose, biologist and recipient of the Nobel Prize in Chemistry, in Brooklyn, New York (d. 2015)
Died: Donald Ring Mellett, 34, American editor who was murdered after confronting organized crime in his newspaper Canton Daily News

Saturday, July 17, 1926
The Aristide Briand government fell in France.
In Mexico City, a meeting of Catholics resolved to organize a nationwide boycott to protest the Calles Law. The boycott covered items that constituted a large part of government income (such as lottery tickets), items subject to heavy excise duties (such as stamps), and items subject to heavy import duties. 
Born: William Pierson, actor, in Brooklyn, New York (d. 2004)

Sunday, July 18, 1926
An anonymous editorial titled "Pink Powder Puffs" was published in the Chicago Daily Tribune which blamed actor Rudolph Valentino for the installation of a face-powder dispenser in a new men's public washroom and implied that he was responsible for the feminization of American men. Valentino was enraged.
Lucien Buysse of Belgium won the 1926 Tour de France.
Jules Goux of France won the European Grand Prix.
The Charley Chase short film comedy Mighty Like a Moose opened.
Born: Margaret Laurence, writer, in Neepawa, Manitoba, Canada (d. 1987); Robert Sloman, writer, in Oldham, Lancashire, England (d. 2005)

Monday, July 19, 1926
Rudolph Valentino responded to the previous day's editorial in the Tribune with an essay of his own for the Chicago Herald-Examiner, challenging the writer to come forward and face him in a boxing or wrestling match. The author did not come forward, to Valentino's disappointment. 
Rumored dissensions among the crew of the airship Norge in the recent North Pole expedition fell into the public sphere as Umberto Nobile shot back at a statement Lincoln Ellsworth had made which denied that Nobile had piloted the airship. Nobile insisted that he steered the entire flight and asserted that Ellsworth was "just a passenger."
Born: Helen Gallagher, actress, in New York City

Tuesday, July 20, 1926
Édouard Herriot took over as Prime Minister of France as the franc continued to plummet, down to 49.22 against the U.S. dollar.
The grand jury in the Aimee Semple McPherson case adjourned, finding insufficient evidence to indict McPherson and her mother on charges of manufacturing evidence and giving false testimony to police.
Died: Felix Dzerzhinsky, 48, Bolshevik revolutionary and former head of Cheka and the OGPU

Wednesday, July 21, 1926
In France, Raymond Poincaré agreed to come out of retirement and form a new government after the Chamber of Deputies overthrew the Cabinet of newly installed Prime Minister Édouard Herriot. The vote of defeat occurred following a statement from Finance Minister Anatole de Monzie that the country was on the verge of bankruptcy.

Thursday, July 22, 1926
In a publicity stunt for the Citizens' Military Training Camp, Babe Ruth caught a baseball dropped from an altitude of about 300 feet from a passing airplane at Mitchel Field on Long Island. It took him seven tries.
The Astoria Column was dedicated in Astoria, Oregon.
Died: Willard Louis, 44, American stage and film actor

Friday, July 23, 1926

Raymond Poincaré formed the new government in France. He took the positions of both Prime Minister and Finance Minister.
New revelations came out in the Aimee Semple McPherson kidnapping mystery, as claims surfaced that McPherson had been around Carmel-by-the-Sea, California, living in a rented cottage with a man named Kenneth Ormiston during the time she was allegedly kidnapped.

Saturday, July 24, 1926
Britain's first greyhound racing track opened at Belle Vue Stadium in Manchester.

Sunday, July 25, 1926
An episcopal letter to the churchgoers of Mexico was published in newspapers around the country, announcing that after the Calles Law goes into effect on July 31, religious services would no longer be held in the churches as an expression of protest.
Born: Whitey Lockman, baseball player, in Gastonia, North Carolina (d. 2009)

Monday, July 26, 1926
Raymond Poincaré of France announced his plan to stabilize the franc by rebalancing the budget with new business taxes, as well as tariffs aimed at protecting imports from French colonies. Markets responded favourably as the franc rebounded to 39 against the U.S. dollar.
The legislature of the Philippines adopted a plebiscite resolution on independence, but it was vetoed by the governor.
Born: James Best, actor, in Powderly, Kentucky (d. 2015); and Lennox Sebe, President of Ciskei bantustan (d. 1994)
Died: Robert Todd Lincoln, 82, last surviving son of Abraham and Mary Todd Lincoln

Tuesday, July 27, 1926
Britain reached an agreement with Lincoln Clark Andrews, the chief of Prohibition enforcement in the United States, to thwart liquor smuggling into the U.S.
Born: Doris Satterfield, baseball player, in Belmont, North Carolina (d. 1993)

Wednesday, July 28, 1926
The United States and Panama signed the Panama Canal Treaty, allowing the American military to conduct peacetime maneuvers on Panamanian territory and obligating Panama to go to war if the U.S. ever did. The treaty was very unpopular in Panama.
Born: Walt Brown, politician, in Los Angeles

Thursday, July 29, 1926
Two thousand pilgrims from Milan attempting to visit the church of the Madonna del Sasso in Locarno were barred entry into Switzerland by Italian authorities. Mussolini had ordered Italians to spend their money within Italy.

Friday, July 30, 1926
Nine were wounded in Mexico City when police fired on churchgoers who refused to leave the San Rafael church. It was reported throughout the city that fire fighters used water cannons to disperse angry crowds who were throwing stones at authorities.
The Albanian Border Treaty was signed, in which Britain, France, Greece, Italy, and the Kingdom of the Serbs, Croats and Slovenes settled the frontiers of Albania.
Born: Thomas Patrick Russell, judge of the High Court of England and Wales (d. 2002)

Saturday, July 31, 1926
Three were reportedly killed, many wounded and about 50 arrested in rioting as the Calles Law went into effect in Mexico.
The French Chamber of Deputies voted in favour of Raymond Poincaré's drastic taxation plan.

References

1926
1926-07
1926-07